This is the list of The Late Show with Stephen Colbert episodes that aired in 2021.

2021

January

February

March

April

May

June

July

August

September

October

November

December
</onlyinclude>

References

External links
 
 Lineups at Interbridge 
 

Episodes 2021
Lists of American non-fiction television series episodes
Lists of variety television series episodes
Late Show with Stephen Colbert